Hommage à Noir ("Homage to black") is a 1996 film/visual poem set to music filmed to honor and highlight the culture of Africa.  Director Ralf Schmerberg shot this film entirely in black and white, which is set to a soundtrack of African rhythms mixed with electronica.

External links

1996 films
German documentary films
German black-and-white films
Films set in Africa
1996 documentary films
1990s German films